Nadezhda Viktorovna Besfamilnaya (born 27 December 1950) is a Soviet athlete who competed mainly in the 100 metres.

Besfamilnaya trained at the Armed Forces sports society in Moscow. She competed for the USSR in the 1976 Summer Olympics held in Montreal, Canada in the 4 x 100 metres where she won the bronze medal with her teammates Tatyana Prorochenko, Lyudmila Maslakova and Vera Anisimova.

References

Sports Reference

1950 births
Russian female sprinters
Soviet female sprinters
Olympic bronze medalists for the Soviet Union
Athletes (track and field) at the 1972 Summer Olympics
Athletes (track and field) at the 1976 Summer Olympics
Olympic athletes of the Soviet Union
Living people
Armed Forces sports society athletes
European Athletics Championships medalists
Athletes from Moscow
Medalists at the 1976 Summer Olympics
Olympic bronze medalists in athletics (track and field)
Olympic female sprinters
Universiade medalists in athletics (track and field)
Universiade gold medalists for the Soviet Union